Mister Johnson (1939) is a novel by Joyce Cary. It is the story of a young Nigerian who falls afoul of the British colonial authorities. Although the novel has a comic tone, the story itself is tragic. Joyce Cary has been quoted as saying that Mister Johnson was his favorite book that he had written. Mister Johnson is often read in schools and has had a wide audience. It has been adapted as a play by Norman Rosten and a 1990 film by Bruce Beresford. Chinua Achebe has said that Mister Johnson struck him as superficial and helped form his determination to write his own novels about Nigeria. Other critics have found Cary's portrayal of his main character patronizing and Johnson himself childish.

Plot summary 
Johnson, a young African, is assigned as clerk at a British district office in Fada, Nigeria. He is from a different district and is regarded as a foreigner by those native to the area. Johnson works his way into local society, marrying there only one wife- he is monogamous-, but never really fitting in. At the same time, he has difficulties in adjusting to the regulations and mechanism of the district office and his official duties. The district officer, Rudbeck, meanwhile, is dissatisfied with his work in the service and his life in Africa.

Rudbeck conceives the notion that a road linking Fada to the main highway and larger population centers will be of great benefit to the region. Johnson, as Rudbeck's clerk, also becomes enthused about this project. Johnson is one of Cary's joy-filled characters, possessor of a great energy that infects all around him. People are drawn to Johnson and follow him without realizing that they are being led. Indeed, Johnson has no clear idea of where he is going.

His delight is in seeing those around him happy. His mood infects Rudbeck and, when Johnson suggests how the books may be fiddled to support Rudbeck's road project, the colonial officer is seduced. But Rudbeck's swindle is uncovered and he returns to England to be with his wife. Johnson now goes to work for Gollup, a retired army sergeant who has married a Nigerian woman and runs the local store. Gollup is an abusive drunkard given to racist epithets, but he admires Johnson's good-humored courage in facing up to his words and blows.

Johnson, in turn, enjoys the compliment to his courage and, when Gollup next attacks him, retaliates. Gollup does not take this kind of violence seriously and thinks no less of Johnson, but he cannot have an employee who has struck him in public. Johnson is let go and leaves Fada. Meanwhile, a shortage of political officers means that Rudbeck must return. He immediately recommences his road-building. Rudbeck and his superior work out the extent to which he can finagle road-building funds from the accounts, but the older man warns Rudbeck that another scandal will destroy his career.

The road-building brings Johnson back to Fada. Rudbeck hires him again and Johnson's infectious enthusiasm makes the road-building successful. But Rudbeck discovers that Johnson has been engaged in petty graft and dismisses him. Johnson turns to theft from the store to support his lifestyle and, when Gollup discovers him, kills the storekeeper. Now Rudbeck must try Johnson for murder. The trial brings Rudbeck to the breaking point. Johnson is found guilty and begs Rudbeck to keep him from the gallows by killing him. Rudbeck follows his heart rather than the rules and does so, though the act will destroy his career and possibly have other ramifications, legal and personal, that lie beyond the close of the novel.

Editions
Michael Joseph Ltd., 1952
London: J. M. Dent, 1995 . With a chronology and suggestions for further reading by Douglas Matthews.

Film adaptation

The book was adapted into the 1990 film Mister Johnson starring Maynard Eziashi in the titular role and Pierce Brosnan as Harry Rudbeck. The film was entered into the 41st Berlin International Film Festival, where Eziashi won the Silver Bear for Best Actor—it was his first major film role.

Other adaptations
There was a 1956 stage version written by Norman Rosten and starring, among others, Robert Earl Jones.

The 1985 Indian film Massey Sahib starring Raghubir Yadav and Arundhati Roy is based on this novel. In the film the colony is changed to British India and the protagonist is changed to an Indian convert to Christianity who marries a tribal girl and, due to his sheer lack of sophistication and corrupt nature, ends up in suspension and finally gets hanged for a murder.

References

Further reading
 Adams, Hazard Joyce Cary's Trilogies: pursuit of the particular real (Gainesville, Florida: University of Florida Press, 1998) .
 Mahood, Molly M. Joyce Cary's Africa (London: Methuen, 1964).

External links 
 
 The Africa Trilogy writing back to Mister Johnson

1939 novels
Novels by Joyce Cary
Novels set in Nigeria
Irish novels adapted into films
Irish novels adapted into plays